Nicola Ciccone (born 21 April 1996) is an Italian footballer. He plays for Sant'Angelo.

Club career
He made his Serie C debut for Cremonese on 20 September 2014 in a game against Südtirol.

On 13 July 2019, he signed with Pergolettese.

On 14 January 2021, he moved to Virtus Francavilla.

On 10 September 2021, he joined to Legnago Salus. On 27 January 2022, his contract with Legnago was terminated by mutual consent.

On 26 July 2022, Ciccone moved to Sant'Angelo in Serie D.

References

External links
 
 

1996 births
Living people
People from Crema, Lombardy
Footballers from Lombardy
Italian footballers
Association football forwards
Serie C players
Serie D players
U.S. Cremonese players
A.C.R. Messina players
A.S. Gubbio 1910 players
U.S. Catanzaro 1929 players
U.S. Pergolettese 1932 players
Virtus Francavilla Calcio players
F.C. Legnago Salus players
S.S.D. Audace Cerignola players
A.C.D. Sant'Angelo 1907 players
Italy youth international footballers
Sportspeople from the Province of Cremona